The Old Spanish Pointer, or Perro de Punta Español, is an extinct breed (or landrace) of dog originating in Spain, believed to be the ultimate ancestor of almost all pointing dogs.

History

In 1644, Alonso Martínez de Espinar described the forerunner of the modern pointers as "a very hard-working animal, with an inexhaustible agility which endures running from morning to night without stopping. Some are so light that they seem to fly above the ground and skillfully tracking and stopping at the spot where the bird is which is being hunted by those behind them."

Although Spain is the origin of the pointing dogs, the British most often mentioned the Spanish Pointer and brought the dogs to England in the 17th and 18th centuries. Stonehengue, a pointer cinófilo scholar, wrote in the late 19th century, that the dog was selectively bred to be faster by only using lighter and faster specimens.

David Taylor, a veterinarian who runs an international veterinary organization, stated that the Spanish Pointer was introduced in Britain and crossed with Greyhounds and English Foxhounds, resulting in the English Pointer.

Similarly, in Germany in the 17th century, the German Shorthaired Pointer was the result of crossing German Hounds, Spanish Pointers and Bloodhounds.

The pachón navarro is generally seen as the dog breed most closely resembling the Old Spanish Pointer.

Last records 

The oldest recorded painting of the Spanish Pointer in England is a painting by Peter Tillemans, created in 1725.

Stories report that during the Spanish Civil War, a Portuguese merchant took one Spanish Pointer from Spain and gifted it to Baron Bichel of Norfolk.

The dog exists in Spain under the name Perdiguero de Burgos.

See also
List of dog breeds
List of extinct dog breeds
Pointing breed

References

External links 

Gundogs
Pointers
Dog breeds originating in Spain
Extinct dog breeds